Seventy-one independent and non-affiliated candidates contested the 2008 Canadian federal election in different ridings across the country. Of these, two were elected: André Arthur in Portneuf—Jacques-Cartier, Quebec, and Bill Casey in Cumberland—Colchester—Musquodoboit Valley, Nova Scotia. Both had parliamentary experience: Arthur was first elected in 2006 as an independent, while Casey had served as a Progressive Conservative and Conservative Member of Parliament (MP) for many years before leaving the party due to policy differences.

Candidates

Quebec (incomplete)

Ontario (incomplete)

References